The 1982 Skate Canada International was held in Kitchener, Ontario on October 28–30. Medals were awarded in the disciplines of men's singles, ladies' singles, and ice dancing.

Results

Men

Ladies

Ice dancing

References

Skate Canada International, 1982
Skate Canada International
1982 in Canadian sports 
1982 in Ontario